Stefan Renggli (born 7 February 1973) is a retired Swiss football midfielder.

References

1973 births
Living people
Swiss men's footballers
FC Aarau players
FC Luzern players
Association football midfielders